Ffrench or ffrench is a relatively rare surname found in Ireland, a variant of the name French.

The name originated in France and was brought by the Normans, who landed in Bannow Bay, County Wexford, Ireland in 1169.

Having settled in South East Ireland, the Norman de Freynes moved and settled north and north-westwards across the island.

According to Surname DB the original name is of Early Medieval English and Norman origin. It is a topographical name for someone who lived near an Ash Tree or Ash Wood, being derived from the Old French "fraisne, fresne", Ash (Tree), from the Latin "Fraxinus", for the botanical species. It was introduced into England by the Normans after the Conquest of 1066 by William the Conqueror. Topographical surnames were among the earliest created, since both natural and man-made features in the landscape provided easily recognisable distinguishing names.

In England, the development of the family name since 1156 (see below) includes:
 Thomas del Freisne (1206, Herefordshire)
 Peter de Frane (1228, London)
 Richard del Frene (1271, Staffordshire)
 Cristina Freen (1275, Worcestershire)
 John del Freyn (1280, Somersetshire)
The modern surname can be found as French, Frean, Frain, Frayn(e), Freen, Freyne, (De)Fraine and Defraine.

Variations
In some rarer cases, the name does not start with an initial capital, but with a lower-case f; see Word-initial ff.

Part of the family branch is considered to be one of the "Tribes of Galway", having been there since the 13th Century.

Notable people named Ffrench or ffrench include:
Alexis Ffrench, British pianist and composer
Alfred Kirke Ffrench VC (1835–1872), British soldier
Baron ffrench, a title in the peerage of Ireland:
Rose ffrench, 1st Baroness ffrench (d. 1805)
Conrad O'Brien-ffrench (1893–1986), British Secret Intelligence Officer
Di ffrench (1946–1999), New Zealand photographic and performance artist and sculptor
Isamaya Ffrench (born 1990), British make-up artist
Leonardo Ffrench, Mexican diplomat
Madeleine ffrench-Mullen (1880–1944), Irish revolutionary and labour activist
Maurice Ffrench (born 1998), American football player
Michael ffrench-O'Carroll (1919–2007), Irish doctor and politician
Mostyn Ffrench-Williams (1914–1963), British swimmer
Royston Ffrench (born 1975), British jockey
Val Ffrench Blake  (1913–2011),  English Lieutenant-Colonel in the British Army, cattle- and horsebreeder, and author
Tony Ffrench  (1939–2019), Dublin, Ireland: secretary Irish Anti-Apartheid Movement, Irish Press worker, genealogist of ffrench family (Wexford branch)

They were also cousins of the French family, French Park Estate, Boyle, who were created Baron de Freyne.

Settlement in Ireland
The settlement of the family in Ireland dates from the period in and around the Norman Invasion, and, initially, emerged in Co. Wexford where the line of Frynshe of Ballintory, has left several descents in the Irish records. The family's founder in Ireland was Sir Humphrey De Ffreygne,  said in different accounts, to have had several sons. His first son Patrick (a common family name in modern times) inherited his wealth and remained in Co. Wexford. His second son, not inheriting much, migrated to County Galway where the same scenario took place. The eldest son remained, and the other sons migrated to other parts of the island of Ireland, including counties Galway, Mayo, Roscommon and Sligo.

In County Wexford and County Dublin

During the 20th. and 21st. Centuries two branches of the family emerged from the ffrenchs based in the Southeast and East regions of Ireland, one a prominent scion, in  Co. Wexford and a second in Dublin city and county. In Wexford, Jim ffrench headed a large household in Rosslare Strand.
Two of the Rosslare ffrenchs entered religious life, while others became green grocers, pub owners and agricultural workers. Aidan ffrench of Rosslare (R.I.P, March 2013) was a well known bon-vivant, locally renowned musician (drummer, singer with local band), member of Wexford Male Voice Choir and campaigner for the  conservation and protection of Rosslare Strand's eroding  sea cliffs. Aidan worked with the former An Foras Talúntais for many years (now Teasgasc – the state agency for Agricultural Research) at its national headquarters in Johnstown Castle, Co. Wexford.

The Dublin ffrench family

In Dublin, Jim's brother Patrick Joseph ffrench (born in Rosslare) established a large household with his wife, Eileen Durning.
Patrick and Eileen initially resided at Russell Square (near Croke Park, Dublin city), then moved to Sandymount, Dublin 4 on the southside of the city, and thence further south to  Glasthule/Sandycove. They finally settled in a mid-late 19th.century, two-storey over basement house at 5 Roby Place in the centre of Dún Laoghaire town, facing the Old Dunleary rail line with views over the famous asylum harbour. In the early part of the 20th.century, Patrick was a keen member of Conradh na Gaeilge (Gaelic League) and participated in the Irish independence movement, being involved, for example, in the famous Irish Volunteers' Howth Gun-running incident of 26 July 1914.
Later, post-independence, in the 1950s, Patrick - having qualified as an accountant - became Assistant City Treasurer with Dublin Corporation (now Dublin City Council).

Patrick Joseph's first cousin was the mother of George Harrison of The Beatles. 
George visited his Dublin cousins on several occasions, during his boyhood years. Some ffrench family albums include black-and-white photographs of George such as those taken on Portmarnock Strand, north County Dublin, with his Drumcondra-based aunts and cousins. In the 1970s and 1980s, Tony ffrench R.I.P - a nephew of Patrick - (formerly of The Irish Press newspaper and secretary of the Irish Anti-Apartheid Movement), developed a strong friendship with George Harrison's brother, Harold, in the course of exploring and documenting the history of the ffrench family in Co. Wexford. Tony's research of the family's ancestral roots was in-depth and comprehensive, revealing that its origins to mid-15th.century Normans who lived in Warwickshire, England, (c.1348 A.D).

The Dún Laoghaire ffrenchs, sons and daughters of Patrick and Eileen – two boys (Paddy, Colm) and seven girls (Monica, Doreen, Eileen, Clare, Joan, Patricia, Marie) – all married with most settling in and around Dún Laoghaire, Monkstown and Sandyford, County Dublin and the remainder moving to England (Paddy, Monica, Marie) and one (Patricia) to Canada, starting in the 1940s and onto the 1970s. They and their children and grandchildren continue to use the distinctive and rare double lower-case version of the surname.

References

Surnames